Danielle Jane Harmer (born 8 February 1989) is an English actress, television personality, and former singer. She is best known for her lead role as Tracy Beaker in the CBBC series The Story of Tracy Beaker (2002–2006), Tracy Beaker Returns (2010–2012), for which she was nominated for a BAFTA in 2010, The Tracy Beaker Survival Files (2011–2012), My Mum Tracy Beaker (2021) and The Beaker Girls (2021–2023). Harmer played the role of Molly Louise Venables in the BBC One comedy series After You've Gone (2007), and starred in her own CBBC sitcom Dani's House (2008–2012) and its spin-off Dani's Castle (2013–2014).

In 2008, Harmer branched into the music industry and signed a £3m record deal with Universal Group. She recorded her debut studio album, Superheroes, in September 2009, and released the single and theme from Dani's House, "Free", but the album was never released and it was later confirmed she had abandoned her music career indefinitely.

In 2012, Harmer competed in the fourth series of Let's Dance for Sport Relief alongside Tyger Drew-Honey, in which they both finished as joint runners-up. Later that year, she competed in the tenth series of Strictly Come Dancing, partnered with Vincent Simone, reaching the final and finishing in fourth place.

Early life
Danielle Jane Harmer was born and raised in her hometown Bracknell, Berkshire, to parents Jill, a former legal worker and children's casting agent, and Andy Harmer, a mechanic and chauffeur. Her parents are now divorced. She has a younger sister named Betsy, who works as a hairdresser. From the age of five, Harmer attended Stagecoach drama lessons. Harmer won a scholarship to attend Redroofs Theatre School at the age of seven, and left with three GCSEs. Harmer's educational achievements beyond GCSEs are unknown.

Career
Harmer made her stage debut at the age of six in the musical The Who's Tommy in the West End. She has appeared in a number of pantomimes: Dolly Mixture in Snow White (2004), the title character in Peter Pan (2005, Alban Arena, 2006 in Worthing and 2010 in High Wycombe), Dick Whittington (2007, Wolverhampton Grand Theatre) and the title role in Cinderella alongside Joe Tracini (2011, York Barbican). She appeared as an extra in Harry Potter and the Philosopher's Stone. Her big break arrived when she landed the title role in CBBC's dramedy series The Story of Tracy Beaker, in which she starred for five series, and in the accompanying feature-length film Tracy Beaker's Movie of Me.

Her other TV credits include the ITV drama series Trial & Retribution, My Family, Pie in the Sky, The 10th Kingdom, Beast, Touch Me, I'm Karen Taylor, "Beep Beep" in the British television series The Beeps, and the pilot for Coming of Age. She was one of the presenters known as "packers" in the 2006 series of the Saturday morning show Mighty Truck of Stuff.

In November 2008, The Guardian reported that After You've Gone was to be cancelled by the BBC, due to ITV moving Coronation Street to the same slot on ITV1. The BBC had announced a fourth series of the show in January of that year to be aired in 2009; however, the series ended with a Christmas special in 2008.

In 2008, Harmer signed a record deal with record label Universal/Decca worth £3 million, under the management of Daniel Glatman, some time before beginning work on her debut album. The album was recorded and written in 2008 with the help of producer and songwriter Tom Nichols, and entitled Superheroes. The album's lead and only single "Free" was released on 25 May 2009, after becoming the theme song of the TV show Dani's House, in which Harmer plays the lead role. The song reached number 117 on the Official Chart. "Free" was featured on the compilation album Pop Princesses 2009. The scheduled release date of Superheroes was October 2009, which was later pushed back to early 2010. Rumours circulated that the album had been cancelled by Harmer's record company due to poor sales of the lead single, she responded that "they are just waiting for the right time to release it". No further comment was made until mid-2012, when Harmer stated via Twitter that she had given up music because she wanted to focus on her acting career. The album never surfaced, but the artwork and 30-second previews of each track were released in early 2010, along with the track list.

Harmer returned to the role of Tracy Beaker in early 2010 in the 13-episode BBC series Tracy Beaker Returns, in which her character had developed into a care worker and had written an autobiography about what life is like for children in care. Three series aired of Tracy Beaker Returns. It concluded on 23 March 2012, due to Harmer deciding to quit her role as Tracy. A spin-off was created called The Dumping Ground but did not feature her, though she did return for two episodes at the end of series 6. She then starred in another TV show called Dani's Castle, a spin-off from Dani's House. This aired at the start of 2013 and ended in 2015.

Harmer was due to star as Jane in Disco Inferno, which was planned to tour across the UK in autumn 2012. However, it was announced on 5 September 2012, after an investor pulled out, that the musical had been cancelled. Harmer confirmed via her Twitter account on the same day that she would be a contestant on the upcoming tenth series of Strictly Come Dancing.

She portrayed Janet in the 2013 UK tour of the stage production The Rocky Horror Show.

In 2018, Harmer joined 26 other celebrities and performed an original Christmas song called Rock With Rudolph, written and produced by Grahame and Jack Corbyn. The song was recorded in aid of Great Ormond Street Hospital and was released digitally on independent record label Saga Entertainment on 30 November 2018 under the artist name The Celebs. The music video debuted exclusively with The Sun on 29 November 2018, and had its first TV showing on Good Morning Britain on 30 November 2018. The song peaked at number two on the iTunes pop chart.

In 2020, it was announced that Harmer would be reprising the role of Tracy Beaker in the 2021 CBBC series, My Mum Tracy Beaker. It follows Tracy as a single mother and is based around her relationship with her 12 year-old daughter Jess (Emma Davies).

The Dani Harmer Academy is a performing arts academy founded and run by Harmer in Berkshire. The academy offers educational classes such as drama, dance and singing, for children and young people. Harmer is also an acting coach at the academy.

Personal life 
On 28 June 2016, Harmer gave birth to her daughter, Avarie-Belle Betsy Rachel Brough. In August 2021, Harmer and her partner Simon Brough announced that she is pregnant with their second child. On 7 February 2022, Harmer gave birth to her son, Rowan León James Brough.

Harmer made a political remark in 2019 after filming a video where she adapted her Tracy Beaker line into "Bog off Tories!"  She expressed her support for the Labour Party through a tweet stating: "Off to vote Labour."

Filmography

Theatre

Strictly Come Dancing 

Harmer competed in the tenth series of the BBC ballroom dancing show Strictly Come Dancing, in 2012. She was paired up with Vincent Simone and the couple succeeded in reaching the grand final and finished in fourth place.

Awards and nominations
Winner of the 2010 Children's BAFTA for Best Drama, Harmer was nominated for her performance as Tracy Beaker in its various incarnations, with the programme attracting a nomination in the Children's Drama Category at the 2011 RTS Awards. Harmer was nominated for a BAFTA Cymru for Best Actress for her performance in Tracy Beaker's Movie of Me. Dani's House, her own hit CBBC show received a 2009 Children's BAFTA nomination.

In 2009, Harmer received a Gold Blue Peter Badge for her role in Tracy Beaker.

References

External links
 

1989 births
Actresses from Berkshire
English television actresses
English stage actresses
English musical theatre actresses
English child actresses
English television presenters
Living people
People educated at Redroofs Theatre School
20th-century English actresses
21st-century English actresses
English women pop singers